

Sponsorship

Club

Coaching staff
{|class="wikitable"
|-
!Position
!Staff
|-
|General Manager|| Aung Tun Oo
|-
|rowspan="1"|Head coach|| Mr. Aung Kyaw Moe
|-
|Assistant coach|| U Zaw Lay Aung
|-
|Assistant coach|| Mr. Yan Paing
|-

Other information

|-

League table
Below is the league table for 2018 season.

2018 Players squad

References

External links
 2018 Myanmar National League

Myanmar National League